Boston Shamrock Rovers (also known as Boston Rovers) were an American soccer team that competed in the United Soccer Association (USA) league in 1967. The team was based in Lynn, Massachusetts and played their home games at the Manning Bowl. The team folded when the USA merged with the National Professional Soccer League to form the North American Soccer League.

History 
In 1966 several groups of entrepreneurs were exploring the idea of forming a professional soccer league in United States. One of these groups, United Soccer Association (USA) led by Jack Kent Cooke, selected 12 cities for team locations and Weston Adams, owner of the Boston Bruins, was awarded the Boston franchise.  The USA originally planned to start play in the spring of 1968; however the rival National Professional Soccer League, which secured a TV contract from CBS, announced it was ready to launch in 1967. Not wanting to let the rival league gain an advantage, the USA decided to launch early. Not having secured any player contracts, the league imported teams from Europe, Brazil, and Uruguay.  Shamrock Rovers F.C. of the League of Ireland were brought over to represent the city of Boston.

Rovers opened the season at home against the Detroit Cougars in a 1 - 1 draw.  A disallowed goal by the Cougars due to an offsides call lead to an argument with the linesman who was hit in the face by a Detroit player. Shamrock Rovers finished the season in last place of the Eastern Division with a record of 2 wins 3 ties and 7 loses, the worst in the league, and with an average attendance 4,171. 

Prior to the 1968 season the United Soccer Association merged with the National Professional Soccer League to form the North American Soccer League. The merged league decided not to have two-team cities and, as such, the incoming Boston Beacons from the NPSL would be Boston's NASL franchise.

Year-by-Year

Records 

 League victory: 3-1 v Houston Stars, July 2, 1967
 League defeat: 0-5 v Chicago Mustangs, June 14, 19671-6 v Toronto City, July 5, 1967

See also 
Boston Beacons
Boston Minutemen
New England Tea Men

External links 
 Boston Rovers stats
 List of Boston Rovers players

Notes

Sources 
 The Hoops by Paul Doolan and Robert Goggins

References 

Defunct soccer clubs in Massachusetts
Shamrock Rovers F.C.
Soccer clubs in Massachusetts
Sports in Lynn, Massachusetts
United Soccer Association franchises
1966 establishments in Massachusetts
1968 disestablishments in Massachusetts
Association football clubs established in 1966
Association football clubs disestablished in 1968